In physiology, psychology, or psychophysics, a limen or a liminal point is a sensory threshold of a physiological or psychological response. It is the boundary of perception. On one side of a limen (or threshold) a stimulus is perceivable, on the other side it is not.

Liminal, as an adjective, means situated at a sensory threshold, hence barely perceptible. Subliminal means below perception.
The absolute threshold is the lowest amount of sensation detectable by a sense organ.

See also
 Just noticeable difference (least perceptible difference)
 Threshold of pain, the boundary where perception becomes pain
 Weber–Fechner law (Weber's law)

References

Physiology
Perception